Silvan may refer to:

 Saint Silvan, Christian martyr 
 Silvan (illusionist), Italian magician
 Silvan Byggemarked, Danish chain store that sells building materials
 Silvan Elves, woodland elves of J. R. R. Tolkien's Middle-earth legendarium
 Silvan Shalom, Tunisian-born Israeli politician
 Silvan, Diyarbakır, city in the Diyarbakır Province of Turkey
 Silvan, Victoria, suburb of Melbourne, Australia

See also
 Silvanus (disambiguation)
 Silvanus (mythology), Roman deity from whom the adjective sylvan derives
 Sylvain (disambiguation)
 Sylvan (disambiguation)